In science fiction,  or mechs are giant robots or machines controlled by people, typically depicted as humanoid walking vehicles.

Fictional mecha vary greatly in size and shape, but are distinguished from vehicles by their humanoid or biomorphic appearance, although they are bigger, often much bigger, than human beings. Different subgenres exist, with varying connotations of realism. The concept of Super Robot and Real Robot are two such examples found in Japanese anime and manga. 

Real-world piloted humanoid or non-humanoid robotic platforms, existing or planned, may also be called "mecha". In Japanese, "mecha" may refer to mobile machinery or vehicles (including aircraft) in general, piloted or otherwise.

Characteristics

'Mecha' is an abbreviation, first used in Japanese, of 'mechanical'. In Japanese, mecha encompasses all mechanical objects, including cars, guns, computers, and other devices, and 'robot' or 'giant robot' is used to distinguish limbed vehicles from other mechanical devices. Outside of this usage, it has become associated with large humanoid machines with limbs or other biological characteristics. Mechas differ from robots in that they are piloted from a cockpit, typically located in the chest or head of the mech.

While the distinction is often hazy, mecha typically does not refer to form-fitting powered armor such as Iron Man's suit. They are usually much larger than the wearer, like Iron Man's enemy the Iron Monger, or the mobile suits depicted in the Gundam franchise.

In most cases, mecha are depicted as fighting machines, whose appeal comes from the combination of potent weaponry with a more stylish combat technique than a mere vehicle. Often, they are the primary means of combat, with conflicts sometimes being decided through gladiatorial matches. Other works represent mecha as one component of an integrated military force, supported by and fighting alongside tanks, fighter aircraft, and infantry, functioning as a mechanical cavalry. The applications often highlight the theoretical usefulness of such a device, combining a tank's resilience and firepower with infantry's ability to cross unstable terrain and a high degree of customization. In some continuities, special scenarios are constructed to make mecha more viable than current-day status. For example, in Gundam the fictional Minovsky particle inhibits the use of radar, making long-range ballistic strikes impractical, thus favouring relatively close-range warfare of Mobile Suits.

However, some stories, such as the manga/anime franchise Patlabor and the American wargame BattleTech universe, also encompass mecha used for civilian purposes, such as heavy construction work, police functions, or firefighting. Mecha also have roles as transporters, recreation, advanced hazmat suits, and other research and development applications.

Mecha have been used in fantasy settings, for example in the anime series Aura Battler Dunbine, The Vision of Escaflowne, Panzer World Galient, and Maze. In those cases, the mecha designs are usually based on some alternative or "lost" science-fiction technology from ancient times. In case of anime series Zoids, the machines resemble dinosaurs and animals, and have been shown to evolve from native metallic organisms.

A chicken walker is a fictional type of bipedal robot or mecha, distinguished by its rear-facing knee joint. This type of articulation resembles a bird's legs, hence the name. However, birds actually have forward-facing knees; they are digitigrade, and what most call the "knee" is actually the ankle.

Early history
The 1868 Edward S. Ellis novel The Steam Man of the Prairies featured a steam-powered, back-piloted, mechanical man.
The 1880 Jules Verne novel The Steam House (La Maison à Vapeur) featured a steam-powered, piloted, mechanical elephant. One of the first appearances of such machines in modern literature was the tripod (or "fighting-machine", as they are known in the novel) of H. G. Wells' famous The War of the Worlds (1897).  The novel does not contain a fully detailed description of the tripods'  mode of locomotion, but it is hinted at: "Can you imagine a milking stool tilted and bowled violently along the ground? That was the impression those instant flashes gave. But instead of a milking stool, imagine it a great body of machinery on a tripod stand."

Ōgon Bat, a kamishibai that debuted in 1931 (later adapted into an anime in 1967), featured the first piloted humanoid giant robot, but as an enemy rather than a protagonist. In 1934, Gajo Sakamoto launched  on a metal creature that becomes a battle machine.

The first humanoid giant robot piloted by the protagonist appeared in the manga  in 1948. The manga and anime Tetsujin 28-Go, introduced in 1956, featured a robot, Tetsujin, that was controlled externally by an operator by remote control. The manga and anime Astro Boy, introduced in 1952, with its humanoid robot protagonist, was a key influence on the development of the giant robot genre in Japan. The first anime featuring a giant mecha being piloted by the protagonist from within a cockpit was the Super Robot show Mazinger Z, written by Go Nagai and introduced in 1972. Mazinger Z introduced the notion of mecha as pilotable war machines, rather than remote-controlled robots. Ken Ishikawa and Go Nagai, later, introduced the concept of 'combination', where several units slot together to form a super robot, with Getter Robo (1974 debut).

An early use of mech-like machines outside Japan is found in "The Invisible Empire", a Federal Men's story arc by Jerry Siegel and Joe Shuster (serialized 1936 in New Comics #8–10). Other examples include the Mexican comic Invictus by Leonel Guillermo Prieto and Victaleno León; the Brazilian comic Audaz, o demolidor, by Álvaro "Aruom" Moura and Messias de Mello (1938–1949), inspired by Invictus, created for the supplement A Gazetinha from the newspaper A Gazeta; Kimball Kinnison's battle suit in E. E. "Doc" Smith's Lensman novel Galactic Patrol (1950); the French animated film The King and the Mockingbird (first released 1952),<ref name="comm">{{Cite web |title=Le Roi et l'Oiseau de Paul Grimault (1980)] – commentary |url=http://marnie.alfred.free.fr/le_roi_et_loiseau.pdf}}</ref> and Robert Heinlein's waldo in his 1942 short story, "Waldo" and the Mobile Infantry battle suits in Heinlein's Starship Troopers (1958).

A transforming mech can transform between a standard vehicle (such as a fighter plane or transport truck) and a fighting mecha robot. This concept of transforming mecha was pioneered by Japanese mecha designer Shōji Kawamori in the early 1980s, when he created the Diaclone toy line in 1980 and then the Macross anime franchise in 1982. In North America, the Macross franchise was adapted into the Robotech franchise in 1985, and then the Diaclone toy line was adapted into the Transformers franchise in 1986. Some of Kawamori's most iconic transforming mecha designs include the VF-1 Valkyrie from the Macross and Robotech franchises, and Optimus Prime (called Convoy in Japan) from the Transformers and Diaclone franchises.

In various media

Anime and manga

In Japan, "robot anime" (known as "mecha anime" outside Japan) is one of the oldest genres in anime. Robot anime is often tied in with toy manufacturers. Large franchises such as Gundam, Macross, Transformers, and Zoids have hundreds of different model kits.

The size of mecha can vary according to the story and concepts involved. Some of them may not be considerably taller than a tank (Armored Trooper Votoms, Megazone 23, Code Geass), some may be a few stories tall (Gundam,  Escaflowne, Bismark, Gurren Lagann), others can be titan sized as tall as a skyscraper (Space Runaway Ideon, Genesis of Aquarion, Science Ninja Team Gatchaman, Neon Genesis Evangelion), some are big enough to contain an entire city (Macross), some the size of a planet (Diebuster), galaxies (Getter Robo, Tengen Toppa Gurren Lagann), or even as large as universes (Tengen Toppa Gurren Lagann: Lagann-hen, Demonbane, Transformers: Alternity).

The first titan robots seen were in the 1948 manga  and Mitsuteru Yokoyama's 1956 manga Tetsujin 28-go. However, it wasn't until the advent of Go Nagai's Mazinger Z that the genre was established. Mazinger Z innovated by adding the inclusion of futuristic weapons, and the concept of being able to pilot from a cockpit (rather than via remote control, in the case of Tetsujin).   According to Go Nagai:Mazinger Z featured giant robots that were "piloted by means of a small flying car and command center that docked inside the head." It was also a pioneer in die-cast metal toys such as the Chogokin series in Japan and the Shogun Warriors in the U.S., that were (and still are) very popular with children and collectors.

Robot/mecha anime and manga differ vastly in storytelling and animation quality from title to title, and content ranges from children's shows to ones intended for an older teen or adult audience.

Some of the first mecha featured in manga and anime were super robots. The super robot genre features superhero-like giant robots that are often one-of-a-kind and the product of an ancient civilization, aliens or a mad genius.  These robots are usually piloted by Japanese teenagers via voice command or neural uplink, and are often powered by mystical or exotic energy sources.

The later real robot genre features robots that do not have mythical superpowers, but rather use largely conventional, albeit futuristic weapons and power sources, and are often mass-produced on a large scale for use in wars. The real robot genre also tends to feature more complex characters with moral conflicts and personal problems. The genre is therefore aimed primarily at young adults instead of children. Mobile Suit Gundam (1979) is largely considered the first series to introduce the real robot concept and, along with The Super Dimension Fortress Macross (1982), would form the basis of what people would later call real robot anime.

Some robot mecha are capable of transformation (Macross and Zeta Gundam) or combining to form even bigger ones (Beast King GoLion and Tengen Toppa Gurren Lagann), the latter called 'combination'. Go Nagai and Ken Ishikawa are often credited with inventing this in 1974 with Getter Robo.

Not all mecha need to be completely mechanical. Some have biological components with which to interface with their pilots, and some are partially biological themselves, such as in Neon Genesis Evangelion, Eureka Seven, and Zoids. Attack on Titan creator Hajime Isayama draws particular inspiration from the mecha visual novel Muv-Luv with its use of "pilots" controlling larger humanoid apparatus.

Mecha based on anime have seen extreme cultural reception across the world. The personification of this popularity can be seen as 1:1-sized Mazinger Z, Tetsujin, and Gundam statues built across the world.

Film

 In the Godzilla franchise the monster Mechagodzilla created by Toho is an Alien Monster that first appeared in the 1974 film Godzilla vs. Mechagodzilla, in subsequent iterations, he was used as a weapon built by the Japan Self-Defense Forces, such as Kiryu and Super Mechagodzilla (which was actually built by the United Nations, along with the JSDF). In the MonsterVerse, he was built by Apex Cybernetics to destroy Godzilla and King Kong.
 Also in the Godzilla franchise, there is a Mecha-King Ghidorah that travels from 2204 to 1992 to kill Godzilla. Also, there is a reimagining of a mech from The Mysterians, which appears in Godzilla vs. SpaceGodzilla and her name is M.O.G.U.E.R.A. which was meant to help Godzilla battle SpaceGodzilla and is also built by the United Nations.
 The Star Wars multimedia franchise features several walker types, such as the AT-AT and AT-ST.
 The film Robot Jox is based around gladiatorial combat between giant mecha.
 In the 1986 film Aliens, Ripley uses a Caterpillar P-5000 Work Loader to fight the alien Queen.
 Sentinel 2099, a 1995 film, features a 40 foot tall walking tank called a Sentinel unit. They are used to combat an alien race known as the Zisk.
 In the 1999 film Wild Wild West, Dr. Loveless attempts to use an eight-storey tall, steam-powered, walking spider to conquer a post-Civil War United States.
In the 2001 film AI: Artificial Intelligence by Steven Spielberg, the term mecha refers to an advanced humanoid robot species featured in the film.
 In The Matrix Revolutions, Captain Mifune leads the human defense of Zion, piloting open-cockpit mecha called APUs, against invading Sentinels.
 In James Cameron's 2009 film Avatar, mecha called Amplified Mobility Platforms (AMPs) are used as instruments of war.
 In Shane Acker's 2009 animated film 9, giant walking war machines called Steel Behemoths were created by the Fabrication Machine to destroy all life on Earth.
 A heavily weaponized powered exoskeleton that envelops the operator is featured in the 2009 film District 9, and aptly named the Exo-suit.
 Guillermo del Toro's 2013 film Pacific Rim focuses on a war between humans who pilot massive mechas known as Jaegers and Kaiju monsters that emerge from the Pacific Ocean. In the second film the Hong Kong technology company, Shao Industries creates Kaiju-Jaeger Hybrids such as Obsidian Fury and the Drone Jaegers.
 In The Amazing Spider-Man 2, the Rhino uses a one-person mecha suit that possesses super strength and defense.
 In the film Iron Man, the Iron Monger, a powered exoskeleton suit operated by Obadiah Stane, is another example of mecha.
 In the final scenes of The Lego Movie, the main protagonist Emmet creates a giant construction mech made of yellow Lego pieces which he pilots to fight in the final battle against Lord Business' forces.
 In Avengers: Age of Ultron, Iron Man uses a mecha named the Hulkbuster to fight the Hulk.

Video games

Mecha are often featured in computer and console video games. Because of their size and fictional power, mecha are quite popular subjects for games, both tabletop and electronic. They have been featured in video games since the 1980s, particularly in vehicular combat and shooter games, including Sesame Japan's side-scrolling shooter game Vastar in 1983, various Gundam games such as Mobile Suit Gundam: Last Shooting in 1984 and Z-Gundam: Hot Scramble in 1986, the run and gun shooters Hover Attack in 1984 and Thexder in 1985, and Arsys Software's 3D role-playing shooters WiBArm in 1986 and Star Cruiser in 1988. Historically mecha-based games have been more popular in Japan than in other countries.

 Metal Gear series (1987 – 2018) by Hideo Kojima, includes mecha as part of its main premise. The series takes place during the modern day and near future, and the prototype nuclear-capable bipedal tanks called Metal Gears are a recurring element. 
A popular classic of mecha in games is the MechWarrior series (1989 – 2021) of video games, which takes place in the Battletech universe.
Intelligent Systems-developed and Nintendo-published games that feature mecha include Battle Clash (1992) and Metal Combat: Falcon's Revenge (1993), a single-player mecha-themed shooter series with real robot-style. All battles are fought with mechas called Standing Tanks (ST).
Squaresoft-developed games that feature mecha include Front Mission (1995 – 2019), a turn-based tactical series of games with real robot-style mecha utilized by near future military forces. Xenogears (1998) also used mecha, called Gears, as a main aspect of the story, and the series continues the use of mecha with the Monolith Soft-developed Xenoblade Chronicles series (2010 – ).Armored Core (1997 – 2013) is a fast-paced action mecha series developed by FromSoftware, set in the distant post apocalyptic futures where mechas called "Armored Core" pilot by mercenaries are the dominant forces on the battlefield. Armored Core games have a wide selection in customizations with the first entry in the series Armored Core (video game) being as one of the early few 3D mecha games that introduced extensive customizations to the mechas in-game.
In the Virtual-On fighting game series, players assume controls of humanoid mecha named Virtuaroids. 
In StarCraft series (1998 – 2017), two of the fictional races (Terran and Protoss) extensively use walkers. In the first game of the series, each faction had only one walker: Goliath (Terran) and Dragoon (Protoss). As of the latest release, in multiplayer games, Terrans have four different walkers (Viking, Thor, Hellbat, and Widow Mine,) while Protoss have three (Colossus, Stalker, and Immortal.) On the whole there are 18 different Terran walkers and 21 Protoss walkers across the entire franchise.
The Monolith Productions game Shogo: Mobile Armor Division (1998) blended mecha gameplay with that of traditional first-person shooter games.Heavy Gear 2 (1999) offers a complex yet semi-realistic control system for its mecha in both terrain and outer space warfare.
In Zone of the Enders (2001 – 2012) by Hideo Kojima, real robots called LEVs exist alongside a more super robot-like mecha type known as the Orbital Frame.
In Battlefield 2142 (2006), mecha fight alongside conventional military units such as infantry, tanks, gunships, and APCs in the European Union's and Pan-Asian Coalition's military forces.
In Supreme Commander (2007), all 3 factions utilize mechs, be they tanks, gunships, or true mechs. The player's Armored Command Unit is one such mech.
The Command & Conquer: Tiberian series franchise (1995 – 2012) features many mechanized walker units. In the last video game of this series, Command & Conquer 4, walkers have gained such predominance that even command centers walk. (In the prior games, they were stationary buildings.) Titan, Wolverine, and Juggernaut are three of such units that have appeared in four Command & Conquer titles.League of Legends (2009), developed by Riot Games, include mecha as part of champion skins, designed as super robots (Mecha Malphite, Mecha Kha Zix, Mecha Aatrox, Mecha Zero Sion, etc.).Hawken (2012) is an online first person shooter in which pilots can choose from a variety of bipedal mechas, each having an intended specialization, to engage in free-for-all or team-based combat. Mechas have special abilities related to their role that, when activated, augment their weapon cooling, damage, defense, accuracy, mobility, stealth, or other characteristic to provide a temporary advantage.War Thunder (2012) during an April Fools event, players were able to control Mecha tanks that consisted of multiple tank turrets and other parts after destroying a certain number of vehicles in a battle.
In  Titanfall (2014) and Titanfall 2 (2016) from Respawn Entertainment, mechas are heavily involved within gameplay and the story.
In War Robots (2014) from Russian developer Pixonic, players only can control mechas to fight each other in a 6v6 battlefield.
In Heroes of the Storm (2015), developed by Blizzard Entertainment, players can take control of the giant mecha, called "Triglav Protector", as a reward for winning objective on Volskaya Foundry battleground. The mecha is co-piloted by two different players, the first serving as a pilot, and the second serving as a gunner. Each player is given control to a different set of unique abilities. In January 2018 and June 2019, Blizzard created two "MechaStorm" events for Heroes of the Storm, featuring multiple mecha skins for a number of heroes, as well as other items for the Collection. A MechaStorm "anime video trailer" was also released, heavily inspired by series such as Mobile Suit Gundam, and Neon Genesis Evangelion.In Just Cause 3 (2015) and Just Cause 4 (2018) mecha make an appearance as downloadable content in both games where they are owned by fictional in-game factions named the eDen Corporation and The Black Hand respectively. In both games, they are able to be piloted by the player.Overwatch (2016), team shooter from Blizzard Entertainment, includes D.Va, a tank hero who pilots a mecha. Stylized as MEKA (Mobile Exo-Force of the Korean Army), D.Va's mecha provides her primary hero abilities as well as being a driver of her backstory in the game's lore. Wrecking Ball is a tank-class quadrupedal mecha robot driven by a genetically engineered hamster named Hammond. The mecha is armed with automatic assault weapons known as the "quad cannons", and can be transformed into a high-speed "wrecking ball" equipped with a grappling hook.Brigador (2016) is an isometric real-time tactical game from independent studio Stellar Jockeys. Players control mechas (as well other vehicles, including tanks and flying "antigravs"), selecting the loadout and use it to complete various objectives.Kirby: Planet Robobot (2016) features extensive use of mecha suit known as the Robobot Armor to solve puzzles and fight enemies. Mecha resembling Kirby with the ability to copy enemy abilities (known as Modes).Iron Harvest (2020) features many mechs piloted by multiple factions. It is set in the 1920+ alternate history universe Scythe, created by Jakub Różalski.

Tabletop games
In Warhammer 40,000, the forces use mecha of a variety of sizes and shapes.Battletech uses hex-maps, miniatures & paper record sheets that allow players to use mecha in tactical situations and record realistic damage.

 Books 
John Christopher's Tripods saga and its TV series adaptation feature tri-legged walkers used by aliens to keep humanity subjugated.
 The Mecha Samurai Empire franchise by Peter Tieryas is about a world where the Japanese Empire rules over the United States of Japan with a variety of different mechas. Many of the pilots are trained at the Berkeley Military Academy and their primary enemies are the Nazis and their monstrous biomechs.

Real mecha
There are a few real prototypes of mecha-like vehicles. Currently almost all of these are highly specialized or just for concept purpose, and as such may not see mass production. Most of these experimental projects were made and first presented in East Asia.
In 2012, Suidobashi Heavy Industry unveiled their prototype of a driveable mecha, the Kuratas.
In December 2016, Korean company Hankook Mirae posted a video featuring a test run of their bi-pedal prototype mecha METHOD-01, designed by Vitaly Bulgarov.
A machine called Land Walker was developed by Sakakibara Kikai with the intention of giving the impression of a bipedal mecha.
In 2018, Japanese engineer Masaaki Nagumo from Sakakibara Kikai completed construction of a functional bipedal mecha inspired by the Gundam franchise. The device, standing 8.5 meters tall and weighing about 7 tonnes, possesses fully functional arm and leg servos.
Another Gundam-based mecha, 30 feet tall and with fully functional articulation, was put on exhibit by Gundam Factory Yokohama on December 19, 2020, and is expected to remain until March 31, 2023.

In the Western world, there are few examples of mecha, however, several machines have been constructed by both companies and private figures.
 The GE Beetle, a mobile piloted manipulator for nuclear materials, which entered operation in 1961.
In 2006, Timberjack, a subsidiary of John Deere, built a practical hexapod walking harvester.
In 2015, Megabots Inc. completed the MKII "Iron Glory" before challenging Kuratas to a duel. In 2017 they completed the MKIII "Eagle Prime".
In 2017, Canadian engineering company, Furrion Exo-Bionics, unveiled Prosthesis: The Anti-Robot, invented by Jonathan Tippett, as the company's flagship prototype mech. It is a 3500 kg, 200 hp, electric powered, 4-legged, all-terrain walking mech intended for use in competitive sport. It is controlled by the human pilot inside via a full-body exo-skeletal interface. In 2020 it was awarded the Guinness World Record as "the world's largest tetrapod exoskeleton".

See also

 BattleMech
 Kuratas
 Megabots Inc.
 Mobile robot
 Powered exoskeleton
 Robot Romance Trilogy''
 Sentry gun
 Walking vehicle

References

External links
 Mecha Anime HQ: Extensive coverage on Gundams and other mecha.
 Mecha Co.
 Japanese Animation Guide: The History of Robot Anime

 
Anime and manga terminology
Emerging technologies
Science fiction themes
Science fiction weapons